Marlene Clark (born December 19, 1949) is an American actress, animator and fashion model. Clark is perhaps best known for her portrayals of Ganja Meda in the 1973 horror film Ganja & Hess and Janet Lawson, Lamont's girlfriend in the sitcom Sanford and Son from its fifth season in 1975 until the series conclusion in 1977.

Early life
Born on December 19, 1949, in New York City or Los Angeles (sources differ), Clark was raised in the Harlem section of New York. before her career in acting, Clark was a fashion model.

Career
Of the films Clark appeared in during the 1960s include For Love of Ivy (1968), starring Sidney Poitier, and Putney Swope (1969), which was directed by Robert Downey Sr. Clark appeared in Hal Ashby's directorial debut The Landlord (1970). Bill Gunn, who wrote the screenplay of The Landlord, then cast her in his unreleased film, Stop (1970). Clark also appeared opposite Jim Brown and Stella Stevens in Slaughter (1972). The same year, Clark was also in Night of the Cobra Woman (1972).

Clark collaborated with Gunn again when he cast her and Duane Jones in the 1973 horror film Ganja & Hess. A.H. Weiler of The New York Times wrote in his review of the film, "Miss Clark is an arresting presence as the enamored Ganja. Also, she occasionally invests an unbelievable character with style and humor." That same year, Clark also appeared in the Bruce Lee film Enter the Dragon (1973), in which she portrayed a secretary.

Clark was also in Black Mamba (1974). The same year, she appeared opposite Calvin Lockhart, Michael Gambon and Peter Cushing in The Beast Must Die (1974). In 1975, Clark was in Switchblade Sisters. Other films Clark appeared in during the 1970s included Clay Pigeon (1971), Beware! The Blob (1972) and Newman's Law (1974). On television, Clark portrayed Janet Lawson, the fiancé of Lamont Sanford in the 1970s sitcom Sanford and Son.

Personal life
In 1968, Clark married Billy Dee Williams in Hawaii. She was the stepmother of his son Corey, from his first marriage. Their marriage lasted only three years, and they officially divorced in 1971. In a 2000 interview, Clark has said she was almost raped while filming a scene for Black Mamba.

Partial filmography

For Love of Ivy (1968) – Radio Phone Girl
Midnight Cowboy (1969) – Girl at Party (uncredited)
Putney Swope (1969) – (uncredited)
Stop (1970) – Marlene
The Landlord (1970) – Marlene
Clay Pigeon (1971) – Saddle
Night of the Cobra Woman (1972) – Lena Aruza
Beware! The Blob (1972) – Mariane Hargis
Slaughter (1972) – Kim
Incident on a Dark Street (1973) – Rose
Ganja & Hess (1973) – Ganja Meda
Enter the Dragon (1973) – Secretary
The Beast Must Die (1974) – Caroline Newcliffe
Newman's Law (1974) – Edie
Black Mamba (1974) – The Witch
Lord Shango (1975) – Jenny
Switchblade Sisters (1975) – Muff
The Baron (1977) – Caroline

References

External links

1949 births
Actresses from New York City
American film actresses
American television actresses
20th-century American actresses
African-American actresses
Living people
Actresses from Los Angeles
20th-century African-American women
20th-century African-American people
21st-century African-American people
21st-century African-American women